In statistics, the Kendall rank correlation coefficient, commonly referred to as Kendall's τ coefficient (after the Greek letter τ, tau), is a statistic used to measure the ordinal association between two measured quantities. A τ test is a non-parametric hypothesis test for statistical dependence based on the τ coefficient.

It is a measure of rank correlation: the similarity of the orderings of the data when ranked by each of the quantities. It is named after Maurice Kendall, who developed it in 1938, though Gustav Fechner had proposed a similar measure in the context of time series in 1897.

Intuitively, the Kendall correlation between two variables will be high when observations have a similar (or identical for a correlation of 1) rank (i.e. relative position label of the observations within the variable: 1st, 2nd, 3rd, etc.) between the two variables, and low when observations have a dissimilar (or fully different for a correlation of −1) rank between the two variables.

Both Kendall's  and Spearman's  can be formulated as special cases of a more general correlation coefficient.

Definition

The Kendall τ coefficient is defined as:

 

Where  is the binomial coefficient for the number of ways to choose two items from n items.

Properties
The denominator is the total number of pair combinations, so the coefficient must be in the range −1 ≤ τ ≤ 1.
 If the agreement between the two rankings is perfect (i.e., the two rankings are the same) the coefficient has value 1.
 If the disagreement between the two rankings is perfect (i.e., one ranking is the reverse of the other) the coefficient has value −1.
 If X and Y are independent and not constant, then the expectation of the coefficient is zero.

Hypothesis test
The Kendall rank coefficient is often used as a test statistic in a statistical hypothesis test to establish whether two variables may be regarded as statistically dependent. This test is non-parametric, as it does not rely on any assumptions on the distributions of X or Y or the distribution of (X,Y).

Under the null hypothesis of independence of X and Y, the sampling distribution of τ has an expected value of zero. The precise distribution cannot be characterized in terms of common distributions, but may be calculated exactly for small samples; for larger samples, it is common to use an approximation to the normal distribution, with mean zero and variance
.

Accounting for ties
When tied pairs arise in the data, the coefficient may be modified in a number of ways to keep it in the range [−1, 1]:

Tau-a
The Tau-a statistic tests the strength of association of the cross tabulations. Both variables have to be ordinal. Tau-a will not make any adjustment for ties. It is defined as:

 

where nc, nd and n0 are defined as in the next section.

Tau-b
The Tau-b statistic, unlike Tau-a, makes adjustments for ties. Values of Tau-b range from −1 (100% negative association, or perfect inversion) to +1 (100% positive association, or perfect agreement). A value of zero indicates the absence of association.

The Kendall Tau-b coefficient is defined as:

 

where

 

A simple algorithm developed in BASIC computes Tau-b coefficient using an alternative formula.  

Be aware that some statistical packages, e.g. SPSS, use alternative formulas for computational efficiency, with double the 'usual' number of concordant and discordant pairs.

Tau-c
Tau-c (also called Stuart-Kendall Tau-c) is more suitable than Tau-b for the analysis of data based on non-square (i.e. rectangular) contingency tables. So use Tau-b if the underlying scale of both variables has the same number of possible values (before ranking) and Tau-c if they differ. For instance, one variable might be scored on a 5-point scale (very good, good, average, bad, very bad), whereas the other might be based on a finer 10-point scale.

The Kendall Tau-c coefficient is defined as:

 

where

Significance tests
However, for  the following statistic, is approximately distributed as a standard normal when the variables are statistically independent:

 

For a 2-tailed test, multiply that number by two to obtain the p-value. If the p-value is below a given significance level, one rejects the null hypothesis (at that significance level) that the quantities are statistically independent.

Numerous adjustments should be added to  when accounting for ties. The following statistic, has the same distribution as the  distribution, and is again approximately equal to a standard normal distribution when the quantities are statistically independent:

where

This is sometimes referred to as the Mann-Kendall test.

Algorithms
The direct computation of the numerator , involves two nested iterations, as characterized by the following pseudocode:
 numer := 0
 for i := 2..N do
     for j := 1..(i − 1) do
         numer := numer + sign(x[i] − x[j]) × sign(y[i] − y[j])
 return numer

A more sophisticated algorithm built upon the Merge Sort algorithm can be used to compute the numerator in  time.

Begin by ordering your data points sorting by the first quantity, and secondarily (among ties in ) by the second quantity, . With this initial ordering,  is not sorted, and the core of the algorithm consists of computing how many steps a Bubble Sort would take to sort this initial . An enhanced Merge Sort algorithm, with  complexity, can be applied to compute the number of swaps, that would be required by a Bubble Sort to sort .

The number of Bubble Sort swaps is equal to:

 function M(L[1..n], R[1..m]) is
     i := 1
     j := 1
     nSwaps := 0
     while i ≤ n and j ≤ m do
         if R[j] < L[i] then
             nSwaps := nSwaps + n − i + 1
             j := j + 1
         else
             i := i + 1
     return nSwaps
With these, the factors  and  used to compute  are easily obtained in a single linear-time pass through the sorted arrays.

Software Implementations

 R's statistics base-package implements the test cor.test(x, y, method = "kendall") in its "stats" package (also cor(x, y, method = "kendall") will work, but the latter does not return the p-value).

See also

 Correlation
 Kendall tau distance
 Kendall's W
 Spearman's rank correlation coefficient
 Goodman and Kruskal's gamma
 Theil–Sen estimator
 Mann–Whitney U test - it is equivalent to Kendall's tau correlation coefficient if one of the variables is binary.

References

Further reading

External links
 Tied rank calculation
 Software for computing Kendall's tau on very large datasets
 Online software: computes Kendall's tau rank correlation

Covariance and correlation
Nonparametric statistics
Statistical tests
Independence (probability theory)

de:Rangkorrelationskoeffizient#Kendalls Tau